APEKSI, the Asosiasi Pemerintah Kota Seluruh Indonesia or Association of the Indonesia Municipalities (AIM). Established on 25 May 2000. In accordance with Act No. 22 Year 1999 on Local Government and Presidential Decree No. 49 Year 2000 on the Establishment of Dewan Pertimbangan Otonomi Daerah (DPOD) or Regional Autonomy Advisory Council, Ministry of Home Affairs and Regional Autonomy issued Decree No. 16 Year 2000 on the Establishment of Local Government Association and Elections of Deputy Local Government Association as Members DPOD. The decision of Ministry of Home Affairs and Regional Autonomy No. 16 Year 2000 is structured to develop the City Government Association, Regency Government Association and Provincial Government Association is truly independent and will be represented in DPOD.

History
In line with the new policy on regional autonomy, members of Badan Kerja Sama Antar Kota Seluruh Indonesia (BKS-AKSI) or Indonesia Inter City Cooperation Agency, at that time under the Jakarta provincial government held a National Meeting/Summit of Mayors all over Indonesia in Jakarta, on May 24, 2000 and agreed to dissolve the BKS-AKSI.

On May 25, 2000, the National Meeting of Mayors all over Indonesia in Jakarta formed a "Working Committee of the Mayor" to consider and make recommendations on the establishment of the "Association of the cities" which eventually was named the Asosiasi Pemerintah Kota Seluruh Indoensia (Apeksi) or Association of Indonesia Municipalities (AIM). Apeksi is a container that is formed by the City Government which aims to help its members to expedite the implementation of regional autonomy and create a climate that is conducive to cooperation among the regional governments. In addition to the above objectives, Apeksi also aims to promote the interests of members of the Dewan Pertimbangan Otonomi Daerah (DOPD) or Regional Autonomy Advisory Council immortalized in order to accelerate the increase in the welfare of society through democracy, participation, justice, and equality that takes into account the potential and diversity of the regions. This committee held a formal meeting on 13–14 June 2000 and the proposal submitted at a meeting of the mayors who have been held in late June 2000.

Musyawarah Nasional (Munas) or National Assembly I Apeksi, on 22–23 June 2000 in Surabaya City, finalize and approve the Statutes and Bylaws Apeksi. Board and Executive Director was selected. Mayor of Surabaya H. Sunarto Sumoprawiro elected as Chairman of the Board and a representative of Local Government Association who sits on DPOD. National Assembly also agreed on several things, including the amounts of fees and Apeksi Work Program 2000-2004.

Along with the passage of time, Apeksi undergone several changes, among them the number of member cities and stewardship. Currently Apeksi consists of 98 municipalities. In addition, through the Munas II in Surabaya City set Mayor of Tarakan, dr. H. Jusuf Serang Kasim as Chairperson of the Board of Apeksi 2004-2008. Then Apeksi Munas III on 22–24 July 2008 in Surakarta City has decided the formation of Composition of Board of Apeksi period 2008-2012. Chairperson of the Board of Apeksi the 2008-2012 period held by the Mayor of Palembang, Ir. H. Eddy Santana Putra, MT. Furthermore, Munas IV on May 30 - June 2, 2012 in Manado City confirmed Mayor of Manado, Dr. Ir. G.S. Vicky Lumentut, SH., MSi., DEA as Chairperson of the Board of APEKSI the period 2012-2016. Apeksi Munas V 26–28 July 2016 in the Jambi City solidified Mayor of South Tangerang Hj. Airin Rachmi Diany, SH., MH. as Chairperson of the Board APEKSI period 2016-2020. In Apeksi Munas VI 11 Februari 2021 in Jakarta solidified Mayor of Bogor Dr. H. Bima Arya Sugiarto as Chairperson of the Board APEKSI period 2021-2024, inaugurated by the Minister of Home Affairs, Police General (Ret.) Prof. Drs. H. Muhammad Tito Karnavian, M.A., Ph.D.

Since inception in 2000, Apeksi has taken a major role in helping the city members. Cities now have the opportunity to initiate the formation of the Association at the national level that is truly democratic autonomy. Apeksi organization of early designed to meet the needs of that actually required the cities (members). In order to assist this purpose, organizational forms and ideas about the role and scope of activities that may be carried Apeksi can also be arranged by the Local Government Association experience already established and proven success at international level.

Chairpersons of Apeksi

Supervisory and Board Period of 2021-2024 
Supervisory:

 Chairperson: Dr. H. Syarif Fasha, M.E./Mayor of Jambi
 Member: Dr. H. Taufan Pawe, S.H., M.H./Mayor of Parepare
 Member: Arief Rachadiono Wismansyah, B.Sc., M.Kes./Mayor of Tangerang

Board:

 Chariperson: Dr. H. Bima Arya Sugiarto/Mayor of Bogor
 Deputy of Government and Autonomy: Dr. H. Marten Taha, S.E., M.Ec Dev/Mayor of Gorontalo
 Deputy of Development: H. Aminullah Usman, S.E.Ak., M.M./Mayor of Banda Aceh
 Deputy of Cooperation: Dr. H. Hendrar Prihadi, S.E., M.M./Mayor of Semarang
 Deputy of Social Welfare and Urban: H. Ibnu Sina, S.Pi, M.Si./Mayor of Banjarmasin
 Deputy of Economy and Finance: Abdullah Abu Bakar, S.E./Mayor of Kediri
 Deputy of information, Advocacy and Law: Dr. H. Maulan Aklil, S.Ip, M.Si./Mayor of Pangkalpinang
 Secretary of Board: Alwis Rustam, M.Int.Dev./Executive Director
 Treasurer of Board: dra. Hj. Dewanti Rumpoko, M.Si./Mayor of Batu

Chairperson of Regional Commissariat I-VI
APEKSI Membership is divided into 6 regional commissariats based on geographical location in Indonesia and each has a board led by the chairperson.
 Regional Commissariat I: M. Bobby Afif Nasution, S.E., M.M./Mayor of Medan
 Regional Commissariat II: Drs. H. SN. Prana Putra Sohe, M.M./Mayor of Lubuklinggau
 Regional Commissariat III: H. Dedy Yon Supriyono, S.E., M.M./Mayor of Tegal
 Regional Commissariat IV: Dr. Jefirstson R. Riwu Kore, S.E., M.M./Mayor of Kupang
 Regional Commissariat V: dr. H. Khairul, M.Kes./Mayor of Tarakan
 Regional Commissariat VI: Capt. H. Ali Ibrahim, M.H./Mayor of Tidore Kepulauan

Program
 Sustainable Development
 Regional Cooperation
 Capacity Building
 Policy Advocacy
 Institutional and Partnership
 Communication and Information
 Administration and Finance

Members
98 Cities in Indonesia with 93 autonomy cities and 5 administrative cities in Province of Jakarta, members of Apeksi:
 Ambon
 Balikpapan
 Banda Aceh
 Bandar Lampung
 Bandung
 Banjar
 Banjarbaru
 Banjarmasin
 Batam
 Batu
 Baubau
 Bekasi
 Bengkulu
 Bima
 Binjai
 Bitung
 Blitar
 Bogor
 Bontang
 Bukittinggi
 Cilegon
 Cimahi
 Cirebon
 Denpasar
 Depok
 Dumai
 Gorontalo
 Gunungsitoli
 North Jakarta
 West Jakarta
 Central Jakarta
 East Jakarta
 South Jakarta 
 Jambi
 Jayapura
 Kediri
 Kendari
 Kotamobagu
 Kupang
 Langsa
 Lhokseumawe
 Lubuklinggau
 Madiun
 Magelang
 Makassar
 Malang
 Manado
 Mataram
 Medan
 Metro
 Mojokerto
 Padang
 Padang Panjang
 Padangsidempuan
 Pagar Alam
 Palangka Raya
 Palembang
 Palopo
 Palu
 Pangkal Pinang
 Parepare
 Pariaman
 Pasuruan
 Payakumbuh
 Pekalongan
 Pekanbaru
 Pematangsiantar
 Pontianak
 Prabumulih
 Probolinggo
 Sabang
 Salatiga
 Samarinda
 Sawahlunto
 Semarang
 Serang
 Sibolga
 Singkawang
 Solok
 Sorong
 South Tangerang
 Subulussalam
 Sukabumi
 Sungai Penuh
 Surabaya
 Surakarta
 Tangerang
 Tanjungbalai
 Tanjung Pinang
 Tarakan
 Tasikmalaya
 Tebing Tinggi
 Tegal
 Ternate
 Tidore
 Tomohon
 Tual
 Yogyakarta

External links

Reference
 APEKSI Vision and Mission
 APEKSI Structure of Organisation

Government agencies of Indonesia
Local government in Indonesia